An academic honor code or honor system in the United States is a set of rules or ethical principles governing an academic community based on ideals that define what constitutes honorable behaviour within that community.  The use of an honor code depends on the notion that people (at least within the community) can be trusted to act honorably.  Those who are in violation of the honor code can be subject to various sanctions, including expulsion from the institution. or in other words, honor code is like a pledge taken by students to the effect that they will uphold academic integrity and ethical behavior and will not engage in any kind of cheating, stealing, and misrepresentation. One of the first such codes was created at the College of William & Mary in the early 18th Century.

US military service academies

Presently, some of the most notable and most stringent honor codes exist at the Federal Service Academies and Senior Military Colleges.

The military academy honor codes not only govern the cadets and midshipmen's lives at the academies but also are deemed essential to the development of military officers who are worthy of the public trust. As such, the codes are not limited merely to academic situations or to conduct on campus; cadets and midshipmen are expected to live by the codes' ethical standards at all times.  The codes are as old as the academies themselves and simply state that cadets and midshipmen do not lie, cheat or steal, nor tolerate those who do. A single-sanction Honor Code, in which any offense results in expulsion regardless of severity, exists at Virginia Military Institute, which features a "drum out" ceremony which is still carried out upon a cadet's dismissal. Outside of the military, Washington and Lee University and the University of Virginia also have single sanction codes.

At three of the service academies and at Virginia Military Institute, anyone who learns of an honor code violation is required to report it. Failure to do so is considered "toleration," which itself violates the code. That also holds true at schools with combined cadet and traditional student programs, such as Norwich University, Texas A&M, and The Citadel, whose honor codes specifically provide that all students, both cadets and civilians, do not "tolerate those who do." It is notable that the three Senior Military Colleges have two honor codes, one for cadets and one for civilians, whether on-campus or through distance online programs, etc. The Honor Concept of the Brigade of Midshipmen at the United States Naval Academy allows the observer of an honor violation to confront the accused without formally reporting. It was found that it was more constructive at developing the honor of midshipmen.  A non-toleration clause, on the other hand, is believed to make enemies of classmates. Additionally, it is thought that one's true honor, if other than utmost, was not able to be formally remediated when hidden from public view. Under the academies' honor codes, violators can face severe punishment, up to being forwarded for expulsion by the Secretary of the Army, Navy, or Air Force.

Stringent honor codes, however, are not limited to military institutions. The all-male Hampden–Sydney College is reputed for an honor code system on a par with military systems, which extends to all student activities both on and off campus (off-campus violations can be prosecuted), and also like the military system, it considers tolerance of a violation itself a violation. Like the Naval Academy, however, those who witness a violation are encouraged to confront the violator and convince them to turn themselves in before resorting to reporting the violation. Another school with a very strict honor code is Brigham Young University. The university not only mandates honest behavior but also incorporates various aspects of Mormon religious law: drinking, smoking, drug use, premarital sex and same-sex relationships are all banned. Also, the code includes standards for dress and grooming. Men must be clean-shaven, and men and women cannot wear short shorts or other revealing clothing.

American academic honor systems
Many military academies have strict Honor systems, such as the following:
U.S. Air Force Academy
U.S. Coast Guard Academy
U.S. Merchant Marine Academy
U.S. Military Academy
U.S. Naval Academy

In addition, the following colleges with a Corps of Cadets maintain an honor code for both the cadets and civilian students:
Norwich University
Texas A&M University
Virginia Military Institute
Virginia Tech
The Citadel

There are also traditional liberal arts and technical universities that maintain Honor systems:
Amherst College, (Massachusetts)
Birmingham-Southern College, (Alabama)
Brigham Young University, (Utah)
Bryn Mawr College, (Pennsylvania)
California Institute of Technology, (California)
College of Idaho, (Idaho)
College of William & Mary, (Virginia)
Connecticut College, (Connecticut)
Colorado College, (Colorado)
Dartmouth College, (New Hampshire)
Davidson College, (North Carolina)
Duke University, (North Carolina)
Georgia Institute of Technology, (Georgia)
Gettysburg College, (Pennsylvania)
Gustavus Adolphus College, (Minnesota)
Hamilton College, (New York)
Hampden–Sydney College, (Virginia)
Harvard University, (Massachusetts)
Harvey Mudd College, (California)
Haverford College, (Pennsylvania)
Hollins University, (Virginia)
Johns Hopkins University, (Maryland)
Kansas State University, (Kansas)
K.J.Somaiya Institute of Management Studies and Research, (Mumbai, India)
Knox College, (Illinois)
Lawrence University, (Wisconsin)
University of Maryland, College Park, (Maryland)
University of Mary Washington, (Virginia)
University of Michigan, (Michigan)
Meredith College (North Carolina)
Middlebury College (Vermont)
Mount Holyoke College (Massachusetts)
University of North Carolina at Chapel Hill, (North Carolina)
Notre Dame of Maryland University, (Maryland)
Lyon College, (Arkansas)
Oberlin College, (Ohio)
Oglethorpe University, (Georgia)
Pohang University of Science and Technology, (Daegu-Gyeongbuk, Republic of Korea)
Princeton University, (New Jersey)
Reed College, (Oregon)
Rice University, (Texas)
Rhodes College, (Tennessee)
University of the South, (Tennessee)
Smith College,(Massachusetts)
Southwestern University, (Texas)
Stanford University, (California)
Stevens Institute of Technology, (New Jersey)
Texas A&M University, (Texas)
Valparaiso University, (Indiana)
University of Virginia, (Virginia)
Vanderbilt University, (Tennessee)
Virginia Commonwealth University, (Virginia)
Virginia Polytechnic Institute and State University, (Virginia)
Washington and Lee University, (Virginia)
Webb Institute, (New York)
Wellesley College, (Massachusetts)
Wheaton College, (Massachusetts)
Williams College, (Massachusetts)
Wilson College (Pennsylvania)
William Peace University (North Carolina)

See also
 Ethical code
 Warrior code

References

Honor
Codes of conduct
Academia

es:Código de Honor